, there were 280 electric vehicles (not including plug-in hybrid vehicles) registered in Newfoundland and Labrador.

Government policy
, the provincial government offers tax rebates of $2,500 for purchases of electric vehicles, and $1,500 for plug-in hybrid vehicles.

Charging stations
, there were 14 DC charging stations in the province, all of them on Newfoundland.

Manufacturing
The province has been proposed as a mining hub for minerals to be used in electric vehicles.

References

Newfoundland and Labrador
Transport in Newfoundland and Labrador